Limacia ornata, is a sea slug, a species of dorid nudibranch. It is a marine gastropod mollusc in the family Polyceridae.

Distribution
Limacia ornata was described from Japan. It has been reported from Sydney, Australia. A similar animal from Western Australia may be a different species.

References

Polyceridae
Gastropods described in 1937